Bonnen is a surname. Notable people with the surname include:

Dennis Bonnen (born 1972), American politician
Dietmar Bonnen (born 1958), German composer and pianist
Folmer Bonnén (1885–1960), Danish painter and journalist
Greg Bonnen (born 1966), American politician
Helge Bonnén (1896-1983), Danish composer and pianist
Suste Bonnén (born 1948), Danish photographer and sculptor